Yangzhong Land Park() is a park in Yangzhong, China. The park is a tourist attraction, which includes leisure activities and entertainment.

Location
The park is located downstream of the Yangtze River downstream, on the second largest island.

Features
The design of the park reflects a water motif, and the garden borders a large pond shaped like a map of China. On the shore is a pavilion, a 100 meter corridor, and a rock garden. An exhibition displays farming tools and equipment. Visitors can fish in the pond, which contains many different Yangtze river fish species.

References

External links 
 Official website

Parks in Zhenjiang
Tourist attractions in Jiangsu